Richard Martin Honig (3 January 1890 – 25 February 1981) was a German penologist.

Life
Richard Honig obtained his habilitation in 1919 and was appointed professor in 1925 in Göttingen.  In 1933, he was forced from the university due to his Jewish heritage and his opposition to the Nazi policies.  The same year, he was invited to join the newly founded University of Istanbul and emigrated to Turkey. There, he wrote a Turkish Introduction into jurisprudence and to philosophy of law (both 1934 f.). In 1939, he emigrated to the USA. Beginning in 1954 and after his retirement in the USA in 1963, he came regularly to teach American law and comparative law and conduct research stints to Germany, in particular in Göttingen. In 1974, the widowed Honig moved permanently to Göttingen, where he resided until his death on 25 February 1981 at the age of ninety-one.

Works
Die Einwilligung des Verletzten, 1919
Studien zur juristischen und natürlichen Handlungseinheit, 1925
Die straflose Vortat und Nachtat, 1927
Römisches Recht, 1936
Kirchenrecht, 1954
Wiederaufnahme im amerikanischen Strafverfahren, 1969
Schwurgericht, 1974

References

Further reading
 
 
 

1890 births
1981 deaths
Jewish emigrants from Nazi Germany to the United States
People from Gniezno
Academic staff of the University of Göttingen
Academic staff of Istanbul University
20th-century jurists